List of the new National Highway numbers (UT-wise).

Andaman and Nicobar Islands

Chandigarh

Dadra and Nagar Haveli and Daman and Diu

Delhi

Jammu and Kashmir

Ladakh

Puducherry

See also 
 List of National Highways in India by highway number
 List of National Highways in India by state

References

External links
 New NH Notification
 OSM NH list

National highways in India
National Highways